Advanced Mobile Location (or AML) is a free-of-charge emergency location-based service (LBS) available on smartphones that, when a caller dials the local (in country) short dial emergency telephone number, sends the best available geolocation of the caller to a dedicated end-point, usually a Public Safety Answering Point, making the location of the caller available to emergency call takers in real-time. AML improves the time taken by emergency call takers to verify the location of callers and can improve the time taken to dispatch an emergency response.

AML is a protocol to transport data with SMS and/or HTTPS from the phone to the emergency call centre in all countries that have deployed AML; it is not an app and does not require any action from the caller. AML is supported in many countries, and by all smartphones running recent versions of Android or iOS, although it can be disabled in user settings.

AML was standardised by the European Telecommunications Standards Institute (ETSI) Emergency Telecommunications Subcommittee (EMTEL) in 2019 as Technical Specifications.

History 
AML was developed in the United Kingdom in 2014 by British Telecom, EE Limited, and HTC as a solution to problematic caller location in emergencies. When a person in distress calls the emergency services with a smartphone where AML is enabled, the telephone automatically activates its location service to establish its position and sends this information to the emergency services via an SMS. The services use either a global navigation satellite system or WiFi depending on which one is better at the given moment. It was estimated that this technique is up to 4000 times more accurate than the previously used system.

Mobile phone support 

Google announced in July 2016 that all Android phones running version 2.3.7, Gingerbread (released in December 2010) or later include AML. Google calls their implementation Emergency Location Service (ELS); this needs to be enabled in phone settings.

Apple devices running iOS 11.3 (released in March 2018) or later also support AML.

From March 2022 all smartphones sold in the EU Single Market must be equipped with AML, following a delegated regulation supplementing the Radio Equipment Directive.

Geographical availability
 AML was deployed in:

The European Electronic Communications Code mandates that all EU states were required to implement AML by December 2020.

AML also works when using emergency SMS service on Android phones in some countries.

Functionality 
AML automatically turns on Wi-Fi and location services on the handset, collects and computes location data, then sends an SMS to the emergency services containing the caller's location, before turning location services and Wi-Fi off again.

The service can also send the data via an HTTPS POST request to the specified endpoint. The country implementing AML decides whether to use an SMS endpoint or an HTTPS endpoint or both.

Integrating AML with emergency services' computer-aided dispatch (CAD) systems is problematic.

References

BT Group
HTC Corporation
Wireless locating
Emergency communication